= Kastellon =

Town of ancient Lycia

Coordinates: 36°17′30″N 29°58′28″E

Kastellon was a town of ancient Lycia.

Its site is tentatively located near modern Muskar in Asiatic Turkey.
